Jiang Zhuoqing (born August 1959) is a Chinese politician, who is serving as the Chairperson of the Shanghai People's Congress since 2020.

Career
Jiang was born in Cixi, Zhejiang province. He began his career as a waiter of Xiangyang Restaurant in 1979, then he studied in Shanghai Business School in 1980. After graduating, he began to serve in Shanghai Finance Bureau, until he served as the deputy Director from 1994 to 2002.

In 2002, Jiang was appointed as the District Governor of Yangpu District. During this period, he established the first online interactive platform between the District Governor and residents in Shanghai. In 2006, Jiang was appointed as the Shanghai Director of Labor and Social Security Bureau, after Shanghai pension scandal. He also served as the Deputy secretary of Government of Shanghai since 2008 and the Director of Shanghai Finance Bureau since 2010.

In 2013, Jiang was appointed as the deputy Mayor of Shanghai. He also co-served as the director of Hongqiao Business Area since 2015.

In October 2016, Jiang was transferred to Jiangsu, and appointed as the Secretary of the Jiangsu Provincial Discipline Inspection Commission. He also co-served as the first Director of the Jiangsu Supervisory Commission.

In December 2019, Jiang was returned to Shanghai and began to serve as the Party Secretary of the Standing Committee of the Shanghai People's Congress. In January 2020, Jiang was promoted to the Chairperson of the Standing Committee of the Shanghai People's Congress.

References 

1959 births
Living people
Chinese Communist Party politicians from Zhejiang
People's Republic of China politicians from Zhejiang
Political office-holders in Shanghai
Political office-holders in Jiangsu
People from Cixi